Skin Deep is the debut studio album by rapper Solé. It was released on September 28, 1999, through DreamWorks Records and was produced by Christopher "Tricky" Stewart and Focus.

Skin Deep found mild success on the Billboard charts in the United States, peaking at #127 on the Billboard 200, #27 on the Top R&B/Hip-Hop Albums, #24 on the Rhythmic Top 40, and #1 on the Top Heatseekers.

The album also produced three charting singles; "Who Dat" was the more successful of the three, peaking at number five on the Billboard Hot 100, while "4, 5, 6" peaked at number twenty-one on the Billboard Hot 100, number nine on the Hot R&B/Hip-Hop Songs and number one on the Hot Rap Singles, and "It Wasn't Me" made it to number forty-four on the Hot R&B/Hip-Hop Singles & Tracks and number nineteen on the Rhythmic Top 40. , the album has sold over 309,000 copies according to Billboard.biz and is currently no longer in print.

Track listing

References

1999 debut albums
DreamWorks Records albums
Albums produced by Focus...
Hip hop albums by American artists